Trey Anastasio is an album by the guitarist and composer Trey Anastasio. It was released on April 30, 2002 by Elektra Records and recorded at "The Barn", his studio near Westford, Vermont. Some of the songs included are evolved, but much less experimental, versions of tracks on Anastasio's first solo album, One Man's Trash, released in 1998. The tracks included were written by Anastasio, along with Tom Marshall, Tony Markellis, Russ Lawton and Scott Herman.

Track listing
"Alive Again" - 4:39
"Cayman Review" - 4:16
"Push On 'Til the Day" - 7:37
"Night Speaks to a Woman" - 4:01
"Flock of Words" - 4:32
"Money, Love and Change" - 4:07
"Drifting" - 3:43
"At the Gazebo" - 3:11
"Mister Completely" - 4:35
"Ray Dawn Balloon" - 3:29
"Last Tube" - 11:22
"Ether Sunday" - 3:40

Personnel
Guitar, vocals - Trey Anastasio
Bass guitar, vocals - Tony Markellis
Drums, vocals - Russ Lawton
Trumpet, vocals - Jennifer Hartswick
Keyboards - Ray Paczkowski
Tenor saxophone, flute - Russell Remmington
Alto/baritone saxophone - Dave Grippo
Trombone - Andy Moroz
Percussion - Cyro Baptista

Additional musicians
Saxophone - Dana Colley
Trombone - Rob Volo
Trumpet - Nicholas Payton
Vocals - Curtis King Jr.
Vocals - Lisa Fisher
Violin - David Gusacov
Violin - Laura Markowitz
Viola - Ana Ruesink
Double bass - Mike Hopkins
Cello - John Dunlop
Flute - Stacey Brubaker
Flute - Karen Kevra
Oboe, English horn - Ann Greenawalt
Clarinet, bass clarinet - Steve Klimowski
Bass clarinet - Craig Olzenak
Bassoon - Margaret Phillips
French horn - Shelagh Abate
French horn - Jocelyn Crawford
Timpani - Peter Wilson
Marimba - Tom Toner

External links
Trey Anastasio's Official Website'
Phish's Official Website

2002 albums
Jammy Award winners
Trey Anastasio albums
Elektra Records albums